36 chandelles is a French variety show which was broadcast from October 27, 1952 to July 26, 1958.

Premise
Jean Nohain created the show made up of a variety of acts including musical performances, sketch comedy, magic, acrobatics, juggling, and ventriloquism for French television.

Legacy
In a 1957 French film called C'est arrivé à 36 chandelles, it features the 36 chandelles as a main plot device in the movie.

Bibliography 
 André Leclerc, Jean Nohain, 36 chandelles, Gallimard, Paris, 1959

References

1952 French television series debuts
1958 French television series endings
1950s French television series
1950s variety television series
French-language television shows